Jindráček (feminine Jindráčková) is a Czech surname. Notable people with the surname include:

 Jaromír Jindráček (born 1970), Czech footballer and manager
 Martin Jindráček (born 1989), Czech footballer

Czech-language surnames